Microporus affinis is a fungus species in the family Polyporaceae. It was first described in 1826 as a species of Polyporus by German botanists Carl Ludwig Blume and Theodor Nees. Otto Kuntze transferred it to Microporus in 1898. It is a widespread polypore that is common in tropical and subtropical regions of both the Northern and Southern Hemispheres.

References

Polyporaceae
Fungi described in 1826
Fungi of Asia
Fungi of Africa
Fungi of Australia
Fungi of Europe
Fungi of North America